Tatra T6B5 is a Czechoslovak-built high floor four axle tram with a pulse-width-modulation ('chopper') speed control. This model of tram was produced by CKD Praha in Smíchov, Prague in the period of 1983-1995, following one year in Zličín until 1996. After ČKD Praha went bankrupt, the final assembly and sale of incomplete trams were managed by Inekon Trams until 2007. The last four trams were supplied to the city of Ufa by late 2007. About 1,150 tramcars of this model were produced. In the former Soviet Union, it is also known as Т-3М. In 2015 most of these trams were used in Russia, Belarus, Ukraine, and Uzbekistan.

Tram description
The T6B5 is notably distinct from the other sub-classes of the T6 series. Its most noticeable difference is its extra width, which causes the front end not to look as "pointed" as the other T6 types.

General
T6B5, is a four-axle motorized single-ended tram. Tram cars can be used autonomously as well as in multiple units, controlled from a single console. It is possible to rise only one pantograph when such trams are driven in sets of two. Yet using three-car tram sets, two pantographs must be up. Controlling the second tram cars from a first is possible even if the traction equipment of a first car is out of order.

Production 
1,279 trams were produced and delivered to:

Note: This is the list of first owners. Stock may have later been resold to other cities not on this list.

Gallery

See also
Pyongyang tram system
Trams and trolleybuses in North Korea

Notes

External links 

Tatra trams
Tram vehicles of Latvia
Tram vehicles of Russia
Tram vehicles of Ukraine
Tram vehicles of Bulgaria
Train-related introductions in 1983